An Thang or An Thắng in Vietnamese may refer to:
 An Thắng, Bắc Kạn, a rural commune (xã) of Pác Nặm District, Bắc Kạn Province
 An Thắng, Hải Phòng, a rural commune (xã) of An Lão District, Hai Phong